Sergio Jaramillo Caro, is a Colombian politician. He recently served as the High Commissioner of Peace under President Juan Manuel Santos leading with Humberto de la Calle the Colombian Peace process between Colombia and the FARC guerrillas between 2012 and 2016. He previously served in government as Vice Minister of Defence, and also held the position of National Security Advisor between 2010 and 2012.

Family

He was born in Bogotá in 1966. He is the great great great grandson of José Eusebio Caro and great great grandson of Miguel Antonio Caro but at the same time is a descendant of the liberal Luis Eduardo Nieto Caballero.

Studies

He studied philosophy at the University of Toronto and philology at the University of Oxford. He received a master's in philosophy from the University of Cambridge and was candidate for a doctorate in Greek at Heidelberg University in Germany. He speaks fluent Spanish, English, German, and French. He also speaks Italian and Russian.

Civil Service

From 2000 to 2001 he worked in Cancillería, where minister Guillermo Fernández Soto named him his advisor for the Diplomacy for Peace program.

From 2001 to 2002 he was a political counselor for the Colombian Embassy in France, where he worked with ambassadors Juan Camilo Restrepo and later with Martha Lucía Ramírez.

From 2002 to 2004 he was named advisor of political issues and strategies for the ministry of national defense over Martha Lucía Ramírez, and there he was in charge of development, the coordination, and writing of The Political Defense and Democratic Security from 2002 to 2003

Between 2004 and 2006 Jaramillo stopped work as civil servant and became an executive director of the Ideas for Peace Foundation (Fundación Ideas para la Paz (FIP).) As such he was in charge of leading a work team that published the series “Siguiendo el Conflicto (Following Conflict)” which reached great influence within Colombian armed conflict analysis. There he published 45 issues of that series.

Between 2006 and 2009 Jaramillo worked with Juan Manuel Santos as vice Minister for human rights and international issues of the Defense Ministry. His work focused on reporting false positives within the army, prompting the prosecutor's office to undertake the investigations of homicides and to exclude military justice. His role was key in the later expulsion of a group of 27 high officers in the army ranks. He came up with human rights policies that regulated force. He was a defender of the consolidation policy with a civilian approach.  He was also a major proponent of demobilization policies.

Between 2009 and 2010 he was the investigator for the Andes University faculty administration. There he led the creation of the group Amigos de La Macarena as a mechanism to draw bridges between private business and the policy of territorial consolidation.

Between 2010 and 2012 Jaramillo took charge as the Senior Presidential National Security Adviser of the Santos government. In this position, he propelled the reactivation of the National Security Council where there was a special emphasis against the criminal bands (bacrim)  and in the strengthening of the policy of territorial consolidation. During this period, he also served as the High Commissioner for Peace.

Since 2010 and until the public announcement in September 2012, he has been the head of the government team in charge of leading the approaches and exploratory phase of conversations with FARC.

He was responsible for the secret negotiations that brought the approval of “ the General agreement for the ending of conflict” between the Colombian government and the guerrilla warfare of the FARC in August 2012. He was also part of the government delegation in the conversations in La Habana, Cuba.

In September 2012 he was designated as High commissioner of Peace along with Humberto de la Calle, chief negotiator of the national government. He was in charge of leading conceptual strategy of all processes with FARC until August 2016.

References

PESTANO, ANDREW V. "Colombian Congress Unanimously Approves FARC Peace." UPI Top News, 01 Dec. 2016.

Giglio, Mike. "Sergio Jaramillo Caro: 'Get Your Own House in Order'." Newsweek International, no. 21, 2010.

Giglio, Mike. "Q&A With Colombia's Sergio Jaramillo Caro." Newsweek. N.p., 12 Nov. 2010. Web. 06 Mar. 2017.

  http://wsp.presidencia.gov.co/portal/Gobierno/AltosFuncionarios/Paginas/SeguridadNacional.aspx
 Volver arriba↑ http://www.hks.harvard.edu/centers/carr/news-events/carr-center-events/event-details/2014/sergio-jaramillo-caro
 Volver arriba↑ http://lasillavacia.com/perfilquien/18889/sergio-jaramillo-caro
 Volver arriba↑ http://www.ideaspaz.org/publications?contentType=all&workArea=3&tag=all&date=all&page=59/
 Volver arriba↑ http://www.arcoiris.com.co/2012/09/sergio-jaramillo-nuevo-comisionado-de-paz/
 Volver arriba↑ http://www.eltiempo.com/archivo/documento/MAM-2061221
 Volver arriba↑ http://www.arcoiris.com.co/2012/09/sergio-jaramillo-nuevo-comisionado-de-paz/
 Volver arriba↑ http://www.hks.harvard.edu/centers/carr/news-events/carr-center-events/event-details/2014/sergio-jaramillo-caro
 ↑ http://www.altocomisionadoparalapaz.gov.co/Pages/default.aspx

Colombian philosophers
Colombian political people
1966 births
Living people